Ram Prakash Gehlote was awarded the Padma Shri in 1957 for his work in the fields of science and engineering.

References 

Recipients of the Padma Shri in science & engineering